Roman Pomazan (born 5 September 1994 in Berdiansk, Zaporizhia Oblast, Ukraine) is a Ukrainian football defender who plays for Dinaz Vyshhorod.

Career
Pomazan is a product of youth team system of Azovstal Mariupol. His first trainer was Eduard Bondarenko.

Made his debut for FC Metalurh in the match against FC Chornomorets Odesa on 15 May 2015 in the Ukrainian Premier League.

In 2019, Pomazan joined Armenian club FC Yerevan.

References

External links
 Profile at FFU Official Site (Ukr)
 

1994 births
Living people
Ukrainian footballers
FC Metalurh Zaporizhzhia players
FC Helios Kharkiv players
FC Dinaz Vyshhorod players
Ukrainian Premier League players
Association football defenders
People from Berdiansk
Sportspeople from Zaporizhzhia Oblast